The Cecil B. DeMille Award is an honorary Golden Globe Award bestowed by the Hollywood Foreign Press Association (HFPA) for "outstanding contributions to the world of entertainment". The HFPA board of directors selects the honorees from a variety of actors, directors, writers and producers who have made a significant mark in the film industry. It was first presented at the 9th Golden Globe Awards ceremony in February 1952 and is named in honor of its first recipient, director Cecil B. DeMille. The HFPA chose DeMille due to his prestige in the industry and his "internationally recognized and respected name". DeMille received the award the year his penultimate film, The Greatest Show on Earth, premiered. A year later in 1953, the award was presented to producer Walt Disney.

The award has been presented annually since 1952, with exceptions being 1976, 2008, and 2022. The second incident was due to the 2007–08 Writers Guild of America strike's cancellation of that year's ceremony. The award that year was meant to honor director Steven Spielberg, but due to the cancellation of the ceremony, the award was presented to him the following year. The third occurrence resulted from various media companies, actors, and other creatives boycotting the awards in protest over its lack of action to increase the membership diversity of the HFPA. 

The youngest honoree was actress Judy Garland, at age 39 in 1962. Garland was also the first female honoree. The oldest honoree was producer Samuel Goldwyn, at age 93 in 1973. In 1982, Sidney Poitier became the first African-American recipient. In 2018, Oprah Winfrey became the first African-American woman to receive the honor. , 69 honorees have received the Cecil B. DeMille Award: 16 women and 53 men.

List of honorees

Statistics

Notes

References

External links
 Official Golden Globes website

Cecil B. DeMille Award
 
Lifetime achievement awards
DeMille family
Awards established in 1952